The  is a railway line on the island of Kyushu, Japan. It connects Yoshimatsu Station in Yūsui, Kagoshima Prefecture with Miyakonojō Station in Miyakonojō, Miyazaki Prefecture. It is also known as  together with the – segment of the Hisatsu Line. Between 1916 and 1923 this line was part of the original rail connection from Kokura to Miyazaki, until the opening of the Nippo Main Line.

Stations

History
The Yoshimatsu–Kobayashi section opened in 1912, and was extended to Miyakonojo the following year. Construction continued east and opened to Miyazaki in 1916, with the line formally named the Miyazaki Main Line in 1917.

With the opening of the Nippo Main Line from Kokura to Miyazaki in 1923, the line adopted that name. In 1932, with the opening of the Miyakonojo–Hayato line, that became part of the Nippo Main Line, and this line's name became the Kitto Line.

Freight service ceased in 1987.

References

Lines of Kyushu Railway Company
Rail transport in Kagoshima Prefecture
Rail transport in Miyazaki Prefecture
1067 mm gauge railways in Japan